The 1918 Texas Longhorns football team represented the University of Texas at Austin in the 1918 college football season.

Schedule

References

Texas
Texas Longhorns football seasons
Southwest Conference football champion seasons
College football undefeated seasons
Texas Longhorns football